Germanism may refer to
 German nationalism
 German loan words
 Pan-Germanism
 Germanisation
 Germanism (linguistics)
 Germanic philology, the philological study of the Germanic languages
 In discussions of English writing, an awkward noun phrase that seems like an attempt to construct a compound noun in the German manner, is sometimes referred to as a Germanism.

See also
 Germanist, one who engages in German studies

de:Germanismus
nl:Germanisme
no:Germanisme
pl:Germanizm
ru:Германизм